James Stewart Shanks (1835–1911) was a 19th-century Member of Parliament from the Otago region, New Zealand.

He represented the Mataura electorate from 1879 to 1881, when he retired.

References

1835 births
1911 deaths
Members of the New Zealand House of Representatives
New Zealand MPs for South Island electorates
People from Otago
19th-century New Zealand politicians